The Kara-Üngkür, in its lower course Tentaksoy is a river in Kyrgyzstan and Uzbekistan. It is a large right tributary of the Kara Darya. The river is formed at the confluence of the rivers Kyzyl-Üngkür and Arstanbap, which originate in the Fergana Range. The river's length is 127 km, and its basin area is 4,130 km2. It discharges into the Kara Darya near the town Kuyganyor, north of Andijan. The Kara-Üngkür is used for irrigation. It flows along the villages Kyzyl-Üngkür, Oogon-Talaa, Charbak and Bazar-Korgon in Kyrgyzstan, and Paxtaobod in Uzbekistan.

References 

Rivers of Kyrgyzstan